Benjamin Lany  (or Laney; 1 January 1591 – 24 January 1675) was an English academic and bishop.

Early life
The son of John Laney, Benjamin Lany was born in Ipswich. He entered Christ's College, Cambridge in 1608, graduating B.A. 1612, M.A. 1615, B.D. 1622, D.D. 1630. He became a Fellow of Pembroke Hall, Cambridge in 1616.

Career (pre Civil War)
He was ordained on 21 February 1619. After a curacy at Madingley he held livings at Hambledon, Hampshire, Bishops Waltham and Buriton. He was also Chaplain to the Bishop of Winchester from 1628. He became Master of Pembroke in 1630.

By Richard Neile he was appointed to the rectory of Buriton with Petersfield, Hampshire, and on 31 July 1631.

He became Vice-Chancellor of the University of Cambridge in 1632.

Civil War years
Lany was appointed on 19 June 1639 to a prebendal stall in Westminster, on the king's nomination. As a devoted royalist and high churchman, Lany on the outbreak of the civil wars become the subject of fierce hostility to the puritan party. He was denounced by Prynne as "one of the professed Arminians, Laud's creatures to prosecute his designs in the university of Cambridge", who, when one Adams was brought before the authorities for preaching in favour of confession to a "priest, had united with the majority of the doctors in acquitting him". When the parliament exercised supreme power he was deprived of all his preferments, his rectory of Buriton being sequestered "to the use of one Robert Harris, a godly and orthodox divine, and member of the Assembly of Ministers"

In 1643  Edward Montagu, 2nd Earl of Manchester and Simeon Ashe led a visitation to the University on behalf of Parliament. This saw Lany deprived of his position. He went into exile with the future Charles II of England.

Career (post Civil War)
After the Restoration of 1660, he became Dean of Rochester — he was instituted on 8 August. He became Bishop of Peterborough the same year — he was elected to the See on 20 October 1660, confirmed 17 November, and consecrated a bishop on 2 December 1660. He then served as Bishop of Lincoln from 1663 — elected 10 March and confirmed 2 April — and Bishop of Ely from 1667. He was elected to that See on 24 May and confirmed 12 June.

He became a Fellow of the Royal Society in 1666.

Notes and references

Citations

Sources

External links

1591 births
1675 deaths
17th-century Church of England bishops
Alumni of Christ's College, Cambridge
Arminian ministers
Arminian theologians
Bishops of Ely
Bishops of Lincoln
Bishops of Peterborough
Deans of Rochester
Fellows of Pembroke College, Cambridge
Fellows of the Royal Society
Masters of Pembroke College, Cambridge
People from Buriton
Clergy from Ipswich
Vice-Chancellors of the University of Cambridge
Burials at Ely Cathedral